The 2008 Mr. Olympia contest was an IFBB professional bodybuilding competition and the feature event of Joe Weider's Olympia Fitness & Performance Weekend 2008 held September 26–27, 2008 at the Orleans Arena in Las Vegas, Nevada. Other events at the exhibition included the 202 Olympia Showdown, and Ms. Olympia contests.

Results

Notable events

Dexter Jackson defeats the reigning champion and two-time Mr. Olympia, Jay Cutler, to win his first Mr. Olympia title
Phil Heath, in his rookie debut at the Olympia, places third
Víctor Martínez, the 2007 runner-up, did not compete due to injury

See also
 2008 Ms. Olympia

References

External links 
 Mr. Olympia

 2008
Mr. Olympia
Mr. Olympia 2008
2008 in bodybuilding
Mr. Olympia 2008